"Bud the Spud" is a song by Canadian singer-songwriter Stompin' Tom Connors. The song is an account of a trucker who hauls potatoes from Prince Edward Island, Connors' home province.

History
"Bud the Spud" was released in 1969 on Connors' album Bud The Spud and Other Favourites. It was written about his truck-driving friend, Bud Roberts.   Connors crisscrossed Canada, performing it along with his many other songs about Canada, at first in small venues.  In this way the song became known through word-of-mouth as well as through radio airplay on CBC Radio.

The song was turned into an illustrated children's book in 1994 featuring Bud the truck driver, and his dog. The song was made available digitally for the first time on Canada Day in 2008.

Popular culture
In 2008, "Bud the Spud" was the first song played on the new Spud Radio station in Pemberton, British Columbia. In 2013, a group of New Democrat Members of Parliament performed the song in the Canadian Parliament Building on their way to Question Period.

Chart performance
"Bud the Spud" peaked at number 26 on the RPM Country Tracks chart on February 28, 1970.

References

External links

"NDP sings Bud the Spud". CBC News, Mar 07, 2013.

1969 songs
Stompin' Tom Connors songs
Songs about truck driving
Songs about Canada